Stuart Elwell (born 14 December 1977) is a professional boxer from Darlaston in the Black Country, England.

He became a professional boxer in the year 2000. His first fight was against Ernie Smith at Wolverhampton Civic Hall, which he won on points. His professional record currently stands at 12 wins out of 16 fights. He has one knockout victory which was shown on Sky Sports on 23 June 2006, against Francis Jones. His professional boxing career was put on hold between 2001 and 2005 when he served several years as a Royal Marine. He also boxed for the Royal Marines including a fight in Sydney, Australia. He won the British Midlands Welterweight championship only three fights into his return to civilian life.

Boxing record
30 Jan 2009
Kell Brook
Bethnal Green, London, England
Lost ref stopped fight 2nd round

28 Nov 2008
Paul Burns
Bellahouston Sports Centre, Glasgow, Scotland
Won PTS 6 Rounds

4 Jul 2008
Ted Bami
Everton Park Sports Centre, Liverpool, England
Lost ref stopped fight 7th round

25 Mar 2008
Vyacheslav Senchenko
Drusba Sportpalast, Donetsk, Ukraine
Lost TKOut 2nd round

18 Feb 2008
Chris Brophy
Radisson SAS Hotel, Glasgow, Scotland
Won PTS 6 rounds

20 Jul 2007
Alexander Matviechuk
Civic Hall, Wolverhampton, England
Won PTS 6 rounds

23 Mar 2007
John O'Donnell
Nottingham Ice Arena, Nottingham, England
Lost PTS 10 rounds

10 Nov 2006
Ben Hudson
Oakengates Theatre, Telford, England
Won PTS 4 rounds

23 Jun 2006
Francis (Franny) Jones
Winter Gardens, Blackpool, England
Won KO 1st round

18 May 2006
Peter Dunn
Town Hall, Walsall, England
Won PTS 6 rounds

10 Mar 2006
David Kirk
Bescot Stadium, Walsall, England
Won PTS 10 rounds

25 Nov 2005
Ben Hudson
Town Hall, Walsall, England
Won PTS 4 rounds

6 Oct 2005
Ernie Smith
Concert Hall (Formerly Town Hall), Dudley, England
Won PTS 6 rounds

1 Apr 2001
Richard Inquieti
Light Bar, Wolverhampton, England
Won PTS 6 rounds

28 Jan 2001
Arv Mittoo
Light Bar, Wolverhampton, England
Won PTS 6 rounds

6 Nov 2000
Ernie Smith
Civic Hall, Wolverhampton, England
Won PTS 6 rounds

Midlands welterweight champion
On 10 March 2006, he fought David Kirk at the Bescot Stadium, Walsall, to take the Welterweight British Midlands Area title. He won on points after 10 rounds. He gave up this belt in March 2007, when he fought for the English title belt.

English welterweight title fight
On 23 March 2007, he fought John O'Donnell for the vacant English Welterweight title, a fight featured on Sky Sports 1. After a close 30-minute contest Elwell came up short 97–94.

WBA Inter-Continental title fight
On 25 March 2008, he fought Vyacheslav Senchenko in Donetsk, Ukraine, for Vyacheslav's WBA Inter-Continental title. The fight was shown live on Eurosport. After a winding blow to the stomach resulting in a standing eight count, Elwell lost to a technical knockout in the second round.

British welterweight title fight
On 30 January 2009, Elwell fought Kell Brook at the York Hall in Bethnal Green, England for the British Welterweight title, a fight featured on Sky Sports 1. Elwell lost in the second round after the referee stopped the bout.

External links
 British Boxing preview of Stuart Elwell
 March 2007 English Welterweight Title Fight Review
 English Welterweight Title Fight Preview
 A Bloggers Review of Welterweight Midlands Title Victory for Elwell
 Sky Sports Review of British Welterweight Title Fight

English male boxers
1977 births
Living people
20th-century Royal Marines personnel
Welterweight boxers